Stanley Joseph Dziedzic, Jr. (born November 5, 1949) is a retired American welterweight freestyle wrestler.

High school
Dziedzic attended high school at William Allen High School in Allentown, Pennsylvania.

Collegiate and amateur career
He was a 1972 graduate of Slippery Rock University of Pennsylvania, where his collegiate record of 118 victories and only two defeats served as Dziedzic's springboard to international achievements in the sport.

Dziedzic won three NCAA Division I Wrestling Championships while at Slippery Rock in 1970, 1971, and 1972, three Pennsylvania State Athletic Conference titles, and a University Division title as a junior. His only two losses in his collegiate record were to NCAA champions Mike Grant of Oklahoma in the 1970 NCAA semifinals and to Carl Adams of Iowa State in 1972.

He won an Olympic bronze medal in the 1976 Summer Olympics and the world title in 1977.

Coaching career
While serving as an assistant coach at Michigan State University from 1972–78, Dziedzic reached the heights in freestyle wrestling in the 163-pound weight class, which at the time was rated as the toughest in the country and world. He won four national championships and two world cups, in 1975 and 1977, placing third in 1973. Dziedzic then reached the apex of his career by winning a bronze medal at the 1976 Summer Olympics and a gold medal at the 1977 World Wrestling Championships.

After retiring from competitions, Dziedzic served as a national freestyle coach for the Amateur Athletic Union from 1978 to 1984, and his tactical and technical expertise contributed significantly to the resurgence of the United States as an international force in the sport. He authored the United States Wrestling Syllabus in 1983, and was instrumental in founding the Olympic 200 project, a developmental program for high school wrestlers. He furthered the modernization of techniques and training methods of USA international teams, and served as vice president of the Coaches Commission of the International Wrestling Federation.

Dziedzic was manager of the 1984 Summer Olympics freestyle team and played an active role in Atlanta's successful bid to host the Centennial Olympics in 1996. He was elected wrestling's Man of the Year in 1980. Dziedzic is honored as a Distinguished Member of the National Wrestling Hall of Fame. He served as president and then vice president of USA Wrestling.

References

External links

1949 births
Living people
American male sport wrestlers
Medalists at the 1976 Summer Olympics
Olympic bronze medalists for the United States in wrestling
Slippery Rock University of Pennsylvania alumni
William Allen High School alumni
World Wrestling Championships medalists
Wrestlers at the 1976 Summer Olympics